MOPAC is a popular computer program used in computational chemistry. It is designed to implement semi-empirical quantum chemistry algorithms, and it runs on Windows, Mac, and Linux.

MOPAC2016 is the current version. MOPAC2016 is able to perform calculations on small molecules and enzymes using PM7, PM6, PM3, AM1, MNDO, and RM1. The Sparkle model (for lanthanide chemistry) is also available. Academic users can use this program for free, whereas government and commercial users must purchase the software.

MOPAC was largely written by Michael Dewar's research group at the University of Texas at Austin. Its name is derived from Molecular Orbital PACkage, and it is also a pun on the Mopac Expressway that runs around Austin.

MOPAC2007 included the new Sparkle/AM1, Sparkle/PM3, RM1 and PM6 models, with an increased emphasis on solid state capabilities. However, it does not have yet MINDO/3, PM5, analytical derivatives, the Tomasi solvation model and intersystem crossing. MOPAC2007 was followed by the release of MOPAC2009 in 2008 which presents many improved features 

The latest versions are no longer public domain software as were the earlier versions such as MOPAC6 and MOPAC7. However, there are recent efforts to keep MOPAC7 working as open source software. An open source version of MOPAC7 for Linux is also available. The author of MOPAC, James Stewart, released in 2006 a public domain version of MOPAC7 entirely written in Fortran 90 called MOPAC7.1.

See also
Semi-empirical quantum chemistry methods
AMPAC
Quantum chemistry computer programs

References

External links
 MOPAC 2016 sales and support information
 MOPAC 2002 Manual
 MOPAC 2009 Manual
 Source code and compiled binaries at the Computational Chemistry List repository:
 Source code (in FORTRAN):
MOPAC 6
 MOPAC 7
 Compiled binaries:
 MOPAC 6 for MS-DOS/Windows;
 MOPAC 6 for Windows 95/NT;
 MOPAC 6 with GUI (Winmostar)
 MOPAC 7 for MS-DOS/Windows
 MOPAC 7 for Linux
 MOPAC 2009 for Linux Windows and Mac
 MOPAC-5.022mn (MOPAC at the University of Minnesota)

Computational chemistry software